Karnan is a 1964 Indian Tamil-language Hindu mythological film produced and directed by B. R. Panthulu. It stars Sivaji Ganesan leading an ensemble cast consisting of N. T. Rama Rao, S. A. Ashokan, R. Muthuraman, Savitri, Devika and M. V. Rajamma. The film is based on the story of Karna, a character from the Hindu epic Mahabharata.

Karnan, which was officially launched in 1963, was shot in palaces at Jaipur and the war sequences were filmed in Kurukshetra, which featured several soldiers from the Indian Army. The film's original soundtrack was composed by the duo Viswanathan–Ramamoorthy, while the lyrics were written by Kannadasan. The screenplay was written by A. S. Nagarajan and the dialogues by Sakthi T. K. Krishnasamy. The film was the first in Tamil to be colourised using Eastmancolor.

Karnan was released on 14 January 1964, during the festival occasion of Pongal. The film ran for over 100 days in theatres, and later won the Certificate of Merit for the Third Best Feature Film at the 11th National Film Awards. It was considered a milestone in Tamil cinema as it brought together the then leading actors of South Indian cinema, Ganesan and Rama Rao. The film was also partly responsible for a resurgence in films based on Hindu epics in the industry. A digitised version of Karnan was released in March 2012 to critical and commercial success.

Plot 

The unmarried princess Kunti is seen taking away a small open box with a live baby boy inside it; she had earlier got a boon from the sage Durvasa for her pious service to him. Kunti could invoke a mantra and be blessed with a child from any male god of her choice. When she tested it playfully, she was blessed by the Sun with the baby, which she abandons in the Ganges to avoid embarrassment. The baby is rescued and adopted by royal charioteer Adirathan, who gives him the name Karnan.

Years later, Karnan feels heartbroken upon realising that Adhirathan is only his adoptive father. Not wanting to become a charioteer like him, he instead chooses to become a warrior, travels to another kingdom and trains there. Four years later, having mastered archery, Karnan returns home. At the same time, a royal tournament is held to portray the valour of royal princes, who have just completed education from guru Dronacharyar. Once there, Karnan challenges the Pandava prince Arjunan in an archery contest, since everyone there has been hailing Arjunan as the best archer ever. Karnan is insulted and refused a chance because of his lowly birth, but the Kaurava crown prince and cousin of the Pandavas, Duryodhanan, saves his pride, and crowns Karnan as the king of Anga. Karnan thus becomes the close friend of Duryodhanan and his wife Bhanumati.

One day, Indran, disguised as a Brahmin, approaches Karnan and asks for his armour and ear ornaments as alms to weaken and prevent him from overpowering Arjuna. Although aware of Indra's intention, Karnan still gives both of the articles that he was born with and which made him invincible. Pleased with Karnan's generosity, Indra gives him a powerful weapon, the Nagastra. Disguised as a Brahmin, Karnan becomes the student of Parashuramar to acquire the Brahmastra; Parashuramar eventually realises that Karnan is a Kshatriya, a tribe he opposes. Enraged, he renders Karnan incapable of using the Brahmastra when most needed, and banishes him.

Karnan later saves princess Subhangi from an uncontrolled chariot; they fall in love and eventually marry. A few years later, Krishnan, a supporter of the Pandavas, learns about Karnan's true background. He tells Kunti that Karnan is her first-born son. Karnan also learns about his birth later. Kunti meets Karnan and gets two wishes from him, one that he will not attack any of her sons (the Pandavas) except Arjunan during the impending Kurukshetra War, and that he will attack Arjunan with the Nagastra only once. Karnan refuses to join the Pandavas and remains the friend of their enemy Duryodhanan.

Before the war begins, Duryodhanan's ministers assemble to appoint the commanders of the army divisions. Bhishmar is appointed the Commander and he starts nominating generals for different battalions. Karnan is insulted because of his lowly birth and given the command of a low rank infantry. The war begins and in the early days, Bhishma retires and Karnan replaces him. The following day, Karnan goes to war accompanied by his son Vrishasenan who fights bravely, but is killed by Arjunan.

The next day, Karnan tries to kill Arjunan with the Nagastra, but Krishnan prevents the weapon from hurting him. Since Karnan cannot use the Nagastra more than once, he is unable to kill Arjunan. A wheel of his chariot gets stuck in a hole, and he steps down to relieve it. Under Krishnan's direction, Arjunan shoots multiple arrows at Karnan that severely wound him, but Karnan still stays alive. Krishnan tells a shocked Arjunan that the Dharma that Karnan performed during his lifetime was protecting his life. Krishnan disguises as a Brahmin, goes to Karnan and asks him his virtues as donation. Karnan generously donates all his virtues to the "Brahmin". Arjunan then shoots a few more arrows at Karnan that kill him.

The Pandavas, who realise that Karnan was their eldest brother, mourn his death. Kunti does the same, while Subhangi dies, traumatised by her husband's death. Arjunan remorses killing Karnan, until Krishnan reveals that the curses by Indran and Parashuramar were also responsible for his death. The film ends with Karnan meeting his father  the Sun  in the afterlife.

Cast 
Cast according to the opening credits of the film

 Sivaji Ganesan as Karnan
 N. T. Rama Rao as Krishnan
 Savitri Ganesh as Duryodhanan's wife, Bhanumati
 Devika as Karnan's wife, Subhangi
 M. V. Rajamma as Kunti Devi
 Ashokan as Duryodhanan
 Muthuraman as Arjunan
 O. A. K. Thevar as Kanagan
 Javar Seetharaman as Bhishmar
 Muthaiah as Shakuni
 K. Natarajan as Charioteer Adhirathan
 Mustafa as Kripachariar
 Veerasami as Dronachariar
 R. Balasubramaniam as Parashuramar

 V. S. Raghavan as Vidurar
 S. V. Ramadas as Indran
 S. A. G. Sami as Dhritarashtran
 Kannan as Sanjayan
 Prem Kumar as Dharuman
 Sandow Indrajith as Bhiman
 Thangaraj as Nakulan
 Chinnaiah as Sahadevan
 Shanmugasundaram as Shallian
 K. V. Srinivasan as Sage
 Master Sridhar as Meghanathan
 Master Suresh as Vrishasenan
 Master Babu as Vrishasenan (first)
 Prabhakar Reddy as Suryan

 Sobhan Babu as Chandran
 Sriram as Iyer
 Samikannu as Iyer
 Stunt Somu as Ghatotkachan
 Pazha. Selva Raj as Durmukhan
 Kuladeivam Rajagopal as Kabandhan
 Professor Ramamurthi as the archery expert
 Sandhya as Kanagan's wife
 Rukmani as Adhirathan's wife, Radhai
 G. Sakunthala as Friend Mangala
 Jayanthi as Draupadi
 Kalpana as Fairy Goddess
 Rajeswari as Friend Satyavati
 K. V. Saroja as Young Kunti

Production

Development 
The screenwriter A. S. Nagarajan wrote a story Arthajamam with the intention of making it a film and presented it to director-producer B. R. Panthulu of Padmini Pictures, who liked the story and paid Nagarajan an advance. Both planned to cast Sivaji Ganesan as the lead actor, but after hearing the story, he was unwilling to "take a risk" and asked Panthulu to instead make a film version of the novel Paavai Vilakku. Instead, Panthulu decided to make Karnan, based on the life of the character Karna from the Hindu epic Mahabharata, and Nagarajan was retained as screenwriter due to his expertise on the subject, while Sakthi T. K. Krishnasamy wrote the dialogues. The film was officially launched in 1963 at Vijaya Studios in Chennai. Panthulu also collected information from scholars Kirupanandha Variyar and Sengalipuram Anantarama Dikshitar. The film's art director was Ganga, the cinematographer was V. Ramamurthy,  R. Devarajan was the editor.

Casting and filming 

K. V. Srinivasan played a minor role as the sage who christens the lead character as Karnan. He also dubbed for the voice of N. T. Rama Rao, who portrays Krishnan, after Ganesan's insistence with Panthulu. Shanmugasundaram was 19 when cast as the charioteer Shallian, and he believes Panthulu accepted him in that role as he had the required physique. V. S. Raghavan, who portrayed Vidhurar, recalled going deep into character for one scene requiring him to walk out of the royal court in anger: "I got so involved in the character that even after the shot was over I kept walking. Only when N.T. Rama Rao stopped me and asked, 'What is this,' did I realise it". The then six-year-old Master Sridhar, appears in a single scene as Meganathan, an orphan who meets Karnan after being accused of setting fire to a school. Sridhar finished his long scene in one take, and was paid 1000 (valued at about US$210 in 1964) for the performance.

Karnan was filmed with an estimated budget of 4 million (valued at about US$840 000.84 in 1964). The high cost of the film was attributed to the transportation costs incurred to move chariots from Chennai to Kurukshetra, where the war sequences were filmed. Permission from the government was sought, cavalry and infantry from the Indian Army were brought to the locations at Kurukshetra and the first rows of the charging armies on horses and elephants had soldiers from the Indian Army. The battle scenes were shot with troupes of the 61 Cavalry Regiment, using 80 elephants, 400 horses and three cameras. Other scenes were shot at palaces in Jaipur. Shooting for Karnan also took place at the Bangalore Palace in the Cantonment area, making it the first film to be shot there. The disrobing of Draupadi from the Mahabharata was filmed but later scrapped as it was feared the scene would depict India in a negative light.

In 2012, Panthulu's son Ravishankar revealed that a few shots involving Ganesan and Rama Rao took as many as four days to shoot, because of the large number of personnel involved. After the release of Karnan, all the chariots made for the war sequences in Kurukshetra, were donated to the Brihadisvara Temple, Thanjavur. The film was processed at Filmcenter in Bombay, and was the first Tamil film to be colourised using Eastmancolor.

Music 
Viswanathan–Ramamoorthy (a duo consisting of M. S. Viswanathan and T. K. Ramamoorthy) composed the music of Karnan, while the lyrics were written by Kannadasan. The songs were recorded using various instruments like Sarangi, Santoor, Shehnai, Dilruba and others that were rarely used in Tamil films. The songs "Ullathil Nalla Ullam" and "Aayiram Karangal" were written first and tuned later; for the other songs, Kannadasan wrote lines to fit the tune. He completed all the lyrics for the songs in two days. The entire soundtrack was completed within three days.

The songs are set in various Hindustani and Carnatic ragas: "En Uyir Thozhi" is set in Hamir Kalyani, "Maharajan" in Kharaharapriya, "Kangal Engey" in Suddha Dhanyasi, "Iravum Nilavum" in Shuddha Sarang, "Ullathil Nalla Ullam" in Ahir Bhairav, "Poi Vaa Magale" in Anandabhairavi, "Kannuku Kulam Yedu" in Pahadi, and "Naanichivandhana" in Darbari Kanada.

Release 
Karnan was released on 14 January 1964 during the festival occasion of Pongal, and distributed by Sivaji Films. Ganesan promoted the film by distributing sakkarai pongal to those who came to Shanti to attend the first screening. The film was dubbed in Telugu as Karna, and also in Hindi as Dhaan Veer Karna.

Reception

Critical reception 

The critic from The Indian Express wrote on 17 January 1964, "Reproducing the incidents from the Mahabharatha, the film has all the aspects demanded by the subject", adding that Panthulu had not spared any effort to do justice to the theme, and was appreciative of Ganga's art direction and Ramamurthy's cinematography. The critic from Ananda Vikatan wrote that while the film's effort to improve the quality of Tamil cinema quality was praiseworthy, they could not see the dignity of the epic, only the dominance of the extravaganza. In a review dated 8 February 1964, T. M. Ramachandran of Sport and Pastime praised the film's extravaganza but added, "What fundamentally makes a film truly great is its absorbing presentation without a dull moment. This aspect seems to have been lost sight of by the makers." Despite being released theatrically in 1964, the film won the Certificate of Merit for the Third Best Feature Film at the 11th National Film Awards, which honoured films released in 1963.

Box office 
In its theatrical run, Karnan completed 100 days in four theatres, including Madurai Thangam (noted as the second largest theatre in Asia during 1964), and Shanthi. In spite of a successful run after completing 80 days, the film was removed from twelve theatres to allow the release of Pachhai Vilakku, another Sivaji Ganesan film. At Madurai Thangam, Karnan earned totally 186,805.62 after its 14-week run there. Despite the film running for over 100 days in theatres, critics like Baradwaj Rangan and The Times of India's M. Suganth state that the film was a box office failure during its release.

Home media 
Karnan was released on DVD by Raj Video Vision. A "5.1 Channel EDS Sound" enhanced version was also released by the same company, featuring English subtitles. Karnan is also included alongside various Sivaji Ganesan-starrers in the compilation DVD 8 Ulaga Adhisayam Sivaji, which was released in May 2012.

Re-release 

A digitally restored version of Karnan was released on 16 March 2012, to commemorate the birth centenary of Panthulu. It is the first Tamil film to be fully digitally restored, costing  and consuming an effort of three years. The effort was undertaken by film distributor Shanthi Chokkalingam, who stated, "The sound negative was totally gone and the five to six reels from the picture negative were damaged to a great extent". Shanthi, who had previously re-released many of M. G. Ramachandran's films, chose to re-release Karnan because of "the emphasis it places on friendship and loyalty". The digital restoration of Karnan took place at Sangeetha Sound Studios in Chennai, after a failed attempt with the Mumbai-based Famous Studios, who earlier restored the 1960 Hindi film Mughal-e-Azam. Visual improvements and audio restoration were excessively worked upon, with Shanthi stating that the "biggest challenge was to restore the background score". DVDs were also used to get the sound and music in its original form. To create awareness about the restoration of Karnan, a teaser trailer was launched on 21 February 2012, which received a positive response.

The restored version of Karnan which utilised DTS 5.1 surround sound, was released in 72 screens across Tamil Nadu, and was released by Shanthi's Divya Films. It was well received upon release, although M. Suganth called the restoration process "far from perfect", and Baradwaj Rangan wrote, "The print occasionally judders, leaving the impression of watching the movie on a screen mounted behind the driver's seat in an auto rickshaw". It had a theatrical run of over 100 days, and having surpassed what it originally managed to collect in its entire 105-day run at Shanthi theatre, the film was officially declared a commercial success. Its success soon established a trend of digitising and re-releasing films in Tamil cinema.

Legacy 

Karnan was considered a milestone in Tamil cinema as it brought together the then leading actors of South Indian cinema, Sivaji Ganesan and N. T. Rama Rao. Along with Ganesan's later film Thiruvilaiyadal (1965), it was responsible for a resurgence in Hindu mythological films, since it was released at a time when Tamil cinema primarily made social films. Actor Y. G. Mahendran said, "Karnan can never be remade. Nobody can replace any of the actors of the 1964 classic, and it would amount to mockery if it is done." Actor Rana Daggubati, in an interview with Sangeetha Devi Dundoo of The Hindu, said that Ganesan's performances as Kattabomman and Karna served as inspirations for his role in Baahubali: The Beginning (2015).

Notes

References

Bibliography

External links 
 
 

1960s Tamil-language films
1964 films
Films based on the Mahabharata
Films directed by B. R. Panthulu
Films scored by Viswanathan–Ramamoorthy
Films set in ancient India
Films shot in Rajasthan
Hindu mythological films